Berthelinia caribbea is a species of a sea snail with a shell comprising two separate hinged pieces or valves. It is a marine gastropod mollusc in the family Juliidae.

Distribution
The type locality for this species is Port Royal, Jamaica.

Description
This species has a translucent greenish colour. There may be a few brown lines on the body and the head.

Ecology
Berthelinia caribbea feeds on Caulerpa verticillata.

References

Juliidae
Gastropods described in 1963